Baa Atoll (includes Southern Maalhosmadulu Atoll or Maalhosmadulu Dhekunuburi, Fasdhūtherē Atoll, and Goifulhafehendhu Atoll) is an administrative division of the Maldives. It consists of three separate natural atolls, namely southern Maalhosmadulu Atoll (which is 42 km long and 32 km wide and consists of 9 inhabited islands), the Fasdūtherē Atoll (wedged in between the two Maalhosmadulu Atolls and separated from north Maalhosmasdulu Atoll by Hani Kandu or Moresby Channel) and the smaller natural atoll known as Goifulhafehendhu Atoll (Horsburgh Atoll in the Admiralty charts).

Situated on the west of the Maldives atoll chain, it consists of 75 islands of which 13 are inhabited with a population of over 11,000 people. The remaining 57 islands are uninhabited, in addition to eight islands being developed as resorts.

Thulhaadhoo Island is traditionally well known for being the only island making lacquerwork handicrafts.

Haa Alifu, Haa Dhaalu, Shaviyani, Noonu, Raa, Baa, Kaafu, etc. are code letters assigned to the present administrative divisions of the Maldives. They are not the proper names of the natural atolls that make up these divisions. Some atolls are divided into two administrative divisions while other divisions are made up of two or more natural atolls. The order followed by the code letters is from North to South, beginning with the first letters of the Thaana alphabet used in Dhivehi. These code letters are not accurate from the geographical and cultural point of view. However, they have become popular among tourists and foreigners in the Maldives who find them easier to pronounce than the true atoll names in Dhivehi, (save a few exceptions, like Ari Atoll).

Geography 

Baa atoll consists in two roughly circular sub-atolls, separated by the narrow Kudarikilu Kandu channel. The total measures approximately 38 km wide (east-west) for 46 km long (north-south), covering a surface of 1 127 km2 surface.

The atoll is formed by 105 coral reefs, representing a reef surface of 263 km2. This reef surface is 61 islands provided with vegetation, and a variable number of sandy bays (between 4 and 14). Half (38) of these islands are less than 10 hectares, constituting less than 20% of the atoll lands.

The biggest island is Dharavandhoo (45,5 ha), followed by Kunfunadhoo (35 ha). The highest point, although difficult to establish, is situated in Funadhoo., with 3,19 m over the sea level.

Biodiversity and ecology

Maalhosmadulu Atoll is also considered as a good example of the rich biodiversity found in the Maldives, including large mangroves and a unique diversity of fauna, such as the benthic fauna. Furthermore, the ring-shaped reef forms known as faru in the Dhivehi language is a reef structure which is unique to the Maldives.

The southernmost uninhabited island of Olhugiri in the North Maalhosmadulu Atoll lies 13 km north of Goifulhafehendhu Atoll. Olhugiri is well known for its unique natural vegetation and for providing two of the only perching sites for the great frigatebird in the Maldives. Likewise, other marine creatures such as sea turtles and hawksbill turtles can be encountered.

The Fisheries Ministry of the Maldives has banned catching turtles or taking eggs from Olhugiri, which also applies to 11 other islands.

One of the most-important species living around Baa Atoll is the Parrotfish. This species eats the corral under the water and secretes it later on as sand. In fact on some of the islands, 70% of the sand found there is the parrot fish's excrement.

Biosphere reserve 
Baa Atoll as a biosphere reserve. The Maldives harbors globally-significant biodiversity in its numerous reefs and demonstrates a long history of human interaction with the environment. Covering approximately 139,700 ha of coastal/marine areas, the site is representative of the Maldives’ high diversity of reef animals, with hard and soft corals, reef-associated fish species, marine turtles, Manta Rays and Whale Sharks. In addition to its 12,170 inhabitants, some 350,000 tourists visit the biosphere reserve annually. As part of a Global Environment Facility (GEF) project, the site has great potential for demonstrating sustainable development throughout the Maldives and the region, while relying on a green economy.

Hanifaru Bay which is known locally as Vandhumaafaru Adi is thought to be one of the few places in the world where whale sharks congregate to mate, although recent research suggests otherwise with the vast majority of the whale sharks seen there being young males. The bay however regularly sees some of the largest gatherings of manta rays worldwide with up to one hundred individuals in the small inlet when the tide pushes plankton into the bay.

The designation of Baa Atoll as a UNESCO World Biosphere Reserve in June 2011 was a significant achievement for the Maldives.
placing it in the company of world famous sites such as Komodo island in Indonesia, Uluru (Ayer’s Rock) in Australia and the Galápagos Islands.

Voavah 
Voavah is the first island designated by UNESCO as an exclusive use island. The island is owned by the Four seasons company and is available for hire. The islands coordinate's are 5.31652 73.07797. The island is also known as Hafnas.

See also 
Reethi Beach
Landaa Giraavaru
Amilla Maldives Resort and Residences

References

 Divehi Tārīkhah Au Alikameh. Divehi Bahāi Tārikhah Khidmaiykurā Qaumī Markazu. Reprint 1958 edn. Malé 1990.
 Divehiraajjege Jōgrafīge Vanavaru. Muhammadu Ibrahim Lutfee. G.Sōsanī.
 Xavier Romero-Frias, The Maldive Islanders, A Study of the Popular Culture of an Ancient Ocean Kingdom. Barcelona 1999.

External links
 Facts and figures about Baa Atoll

Administrative atolls of the Maldives
Atolls of the Maldives